The national emblem of Algeria (Arabic: الشعار الوطني الجزائري, Tamazight: ⵜⴰⵎⴰⵜⴰⵔⵜ ⴰⵏⴰⵎⵓⵔ ⵏ ⵍⵣⵣⴰⵢⵔ) is the seal used by the government, as other states use coats of arms.

Description
The current form of the emblem with Arabic writing was adopted on 1 November 1976, but was only differentiated from previous one by the changing of the motto from French to Arabic. Contained on the emblem is the crescent that is also found on the flag of Algeria, and is a symbol of Islam.  The text that encircles the emblem says in Arabic:  ("The People's Democratic Republic of Algeria", the country's official name).

The hand of Fatima, a traditional symbol of the region, appears in front of the Atlas Mountains, below a rising sun representing a new era.  Buildings stand for industry and plants for agriculture.

Historic coats of arms and emblems

See also
Flag of Algeria

References

External links

Official website of the Government of Algeria
Algeria at national-symbol.com

Algeria
National symbols of Algeria
Algerian coats of arms
Algeria
Algeria
Algeria
Algeria